Lake Muskoka/Dudley Bay Water Aerodrome  is located  northeast of Bala, Ontario, Canada.

See also
 List of airports in the Bala, Ontario area

References

Registered aerodromes in Ontario
Seaplane bases in Ontario

Transport in Bala, Ontario